Ziruki-ye Gowhar Kuh (also Romanized as Zīrūkī-ye Gowhar Kūh; also known as Zīrakī, Zīrūkī, and Zīrūkī Gohar Kūh) is a village in Gowhar Kuh Rural District, Nukabad District, Khash County, Sistan and Baluchestan Province, Iran. At the 2006 census, its population was 23, in 5 families.

References 

Populated places in Khash County